Tical may refer to:

 Tical (unit), an archaic unit of mass and currency in Southeast Asia.

 Derivative currencies of the unit:
 Cambodian tical, the currency of Cambodia until 1875
 Thai baht, formerly known to foreigners as the tical
 Tical (album), an album by Method Man

See also
 
 Tikal (disambiguation)